The spangled cichlid (Limnochromis auritus) is a species of cichlid endemic to Lake Tanganyika where it is found in deep waters.  This species can reach a length of  TL.  It can also be found in the aquarium trade.

References

Spangled cichlid
Fish described in 1901
Taxa named by George Albert Boulenger
Taxonomy articles created by Polbot